Chuck Martin (born August 20, 1967) is an American freestyle skier. He competed in the men's moguls event at the 1992 Winter Olympics.

References

External links
 

1967 births
Living people
American male freestyle skiers
Olympic freestyle skiers of the United States
Freestyle skiers at the 1992 Winter Olympics
People from Rutland, Vermont
Sportspeople from Vermont